Jamie Adjetey-Nelson (born May 20, 1984) is a Canadian athlete who competes in the decathlon. He grew up in Windsor, Ontario and was a part of their track and field team, the University of Windsor Athletics club, and the University of Windsor track and field team. Adjetey-Nelson won gold in the decathlon at the 2010 Commonwealth Games.

Competition record

References

External links
Athletics Canada Profile
IAAF Biography

1984 births
Living people
Athletes (track and field) at the 2010 Commonwealth Games
Black Canadian track and field athletes
Commonwealth Games gold medallists for Canada
Canadian decathletes
Commonwealth Games medallists in athletics
Athletes from Toronto
Sportspeople from Scarborough, Toronto
Competitors at the 2007 Summer Universiade
Competitors at the 2009 Summer Universiade
Medallists at the 2010 Commonwealth Games